Civilian Labor Group or CLG are organisations of German or other European nationals employed by the US Army in Europe.  They often wear American fatigues or a blue uniform with various insignia identifying them as CLG members.

History

The Labor Service Units were created to support the Berlin Airlift of 1948-1949.  With the creation of the Bundeswehr in 1955, the Labor Service Units were renamed Civilian Labor Groups. The units performed a variety of functions such as Signals, Construction, Bridging, and Security.  One CLG was assigned to the US Army's 565th Engineer Battalion.

See also
 Polish Armed Forces in the West

External links
 6970th Civilian Support Center
 6900th Civilian Support Center
 6981st CSG
 Labor Service/Troops list of references
 History of the U.S. Forces in Germany Labor Service and Civilian Support Organization

References

20th-century history of the United States Army